Željko Perušić (23 March 1936 – 28 September 2017) was a Croatian footballer. He was part of the Yugoslav squad that won gold at the 1960 Summer Olympics.

Club career
During his club career he played for NK Dinamo Zagreb, TSV 1860 München and FC St. Gallen.

International career
He made his debut for Yugoslavia in a November 1959 Olympic Games qualification match against Greece and earned a total of 27 caps, scoring no goals. He participated in the 1960 European Nations' Cup. His final international was a March 1964 friendly away against Bulgaria.

Post-playing career
He then became a football manager in Switzerland.

Honours

Club

Dinamo Zagreb
 Yugoslav First League: 1957–58
 Yugoslav Cup: 1959–60, 1962–63

TSV 1860 Munich
 Bundesliga: 1965–66

International

Yugoslavia
 Olympic Gold Medal: 1960

References

External links
 

1936 births
2017 deaths
People from Duga Resa
Association football midfielders
Yugoslav footballers
Yugoslavia international footballers
1960 European Nations' Cup players
Olympic footballers of Yugoslavia
Footballers at the 1960 Summer Olympics
Olympic gold medalists for Yugoslavia
Medalists at the 1960 Summer Olympics
Olympic medalists in football
GNK Dinamo Zagreb players
TSV 1860 Munich players
FC St. Gallen players
Yugoslav First League players
Bundesliga players
Swiss Challenge League players
Swiss Super League players
Yugoslav expatriate footballers
Expatriate footballers in West Germany
Yugoslav expatriate sportspeople in West Germany
Expatriate footballers in Switzerland
Yugoslav expatriate sportspeople in Switzerland
Yugoslav football managers
FC St. Gallen managers
FC Vaduz managers
Yugoslav expatriate football managers
Expatriate football managers in Switzerland